Philipp Herschkowitz (Russian: Филипп Гершкович, Filipp Gershkovich) (7 September 1906 – 5 January 1989) was a Romanian-born composer and music theorist, pupil of Alban Berg and Anton Webern, who spent 47 years, from 1940 to 1987, in the Soviet Union.

Biography
Born to a Jewish family in Iaşi, he graduated from the conservatory in the city in 1927 and entered the Music Academy in Vienna, Austria, where he studied with Joseph Marx. Then he studied privately with Berg (1928–1931), and with Webern (1934–1939). He left Nazi German-occupied Austria and arrived in the Soviet Union in 1940, settling first in Chernovtsy, which he left on 22 June 1941 at the beginning of the German invasion, and then moving to Tashkent (in the Uzbek SSR) where he lived until 1944.

He settled in Moscow in 1946, where we began to teach privately, exerting a major influence on several generations of Russian musicians, including leading figures of the so-called "Underground division". Among these were the composers Andrei Volkonsky, Edison Denisov, Alfred Schnittke, Sofia Gubaidulina, Nikolai Karetnikov, Boris Tishchenko,  Valentin Silvestrov, Leonid Hrabovsky, Vyacheslav Artyomov, Vladimir Dashkevich, Alexander Voustin, Vladislav Shoot, Viktor Suslin, Dmitri Smirnov, Elena Firsova, Leonid Hoffman, Vladislav Soyfer; the musicologists Mikhail Druskin, Natan Fishman, Yuri Kholopov, and many others. 
 
Herschkowitz was one of the most important pupils of Webern, and devoted his life to the understanding and development of his teacher's ideas. He was interested in exploring and creating a theoretical foundation to Webern's musical thought. He focussed on the analysis of the music of the great masters and in particular on Beethoven. The essence of this approach lies in the exploration of musical material in terms of the opposition between two fundamental categories: Fest ("fixed") and Locker ("floating").

By the invitation of the Alban-Berg-Stiftung, he returned to Vienna in 1987 — he died there two years later. The four volumes of his book On music that contain the essence of his teaching were edited and published by his widow Lena Herschkowitz and Klaus Linder in Moscow in 1991–1997.

Works 
 1929	Waltz for piano (planned as part of a larger composition)
 1930	Die Tulpen (Tulips).  Melodrama after Peter Altenberg (project)
 1930	Fugue for 14 solo instruments (flute, oboe, clarinet, bass clarinet, bassoon, alto saxophone, horn, trumpet, harp, percussion, violin, viola, cello, double bass and piano (planned as part of a larger composition)
 1932	Wie des Mondes Abbild zittert (Heinrich Heine) for voice and piano
 1947	Vesennie tsvety  (Spring Flowers) for piano
 1950s	Capriccio, 2 pF. ‘Sovetsky Kompozitor’, Moscow, 1957
 1960s	Drei Klavierstücke (Three Piano Pieces)
 1960s	Fünf Klavierstücke (Five Piano Pieces)
 1962	Vier Lieder (Four Songs, Paul Celan) for mezzo-soprano and piano
 1965–6 3 lieduri (Three Songs, Ion Barbu) for voice and piano
 1960s	Brandmal (Paul Celan) for voice and piano
 1968	Vier Stücke (Four Pieces) for cello and piano
 1969	Klavierstück (Piano Piece) in 4 movements
 1971	Brandmal (Paul Celan) for mezzo-soprano, flute, 2 clarinets, piano in 4 hands, percussion, 6 violas and double bass
 early 1970s 	Espenbaum (Paul Celan) for mezzo-soprano, flute, 2 clarinets, percussion, piano in 4 hands, 6 violas and double bass
 early 1970s 	Leuchten (Paul Celan) for mezzo-soprano, 2 flutes, 2 clarinets, bass clarinet, 2 bassoons, 4 horns, piano, 4 violins, 2 violas and 2 celli
 early 1970s	Vier Lieder (Four Songs, Paul Celan) for mezzo-soprano, 2 flutes, 2 clarinets, bass clarinet, 2 bassoons, 4 horns, small drum, piano, 4 violins, 2 violas and 2 celli	
 1970s	Drei Stücke (Three Pieces) for cello and piano
 1970s	Malaya kamernaya syuita  (A Small Chamber Suite) for 2 clarinets, violin, viola, cello and piano
 1979	Malaya kamernaya syuita  (A Small Chamber Suite) for mezzo-soprano, 2 clarinets, violin, 2 violas, cello and
 1983	Madrigaly (Madrigals) setting the poems of Rainer Maria Rilke, Federico García Lorca and Guillaume Apollinaire
 1980s 	Beethoven's String Quartet in F Major (Hess 34) after his Ninth Piano Sonata (Op.14/1), arranged for string orchestra.
 1987-8	Drei Gesänge mit Begleitung eines Kammerensembles (Three Songs with Chamber-Ensemble Accompaniment)

References
 Herschkowitz, Philipp: On music. Books I–IV. Ed. Lena Herschkowitz and Klaus Linder, Moscow, 1991–7 (collected writings in Russian, but some fragments in English and German)
 Dmitri Smirnov: A Geometer of Sound Crystals – A Book on Herschkowitz: by Verlag Ernst Kuhn – Berlin in 2003 (in English)
 Dmitri N. Smirnov: A Geometer of Sound Crystals – A Book on Herschkowitz. 2nd edition Revised and Enlarged. Meladina Books Series, St Albans/Charleston, 2017 (in English)
 Yuri Kholopov: Philip Gershkovich’s search for the lost essence of music; also: List of Philip Gershkovich’s musicological research studies; List of Philip Gershkovich’s musical compositions; Some of Philip Gershkovich’s aphorisms. In: «Ex oriente...III» Eight Composers from the former USSR Philip Gershkovich, Boris Tishchenko, Leonid Grabovsky, Alexander Knaifel, Vladislav Shoot, Alexander Vustin, Alexander Raskatov, Sergei Pavlenko. Edited by Valeria Tsenova. English edition only. (studia slavica musicologica, Bd. 31) Verlag Ernst Kuhn – Berlin 
 Klaus Linder: Philip Herschkowitz: article in Grove Dictionary of Music
 Hanspeter Krellman: Anton Webern in Selbstzeugnissen und Bilddokumenten (Hamburg, 1975)
 Hermann Scherchen: Aus meinem Leben, Rußland in jenen Jahren: Erinnerungen, ed. E. Klemm (Berlin, 1984)

External links 
 Dmitri N. Smirnov. An introduction to Herschkowitz from "Geometer of Sound Crystals: A Book on Philipp Herschkowitz"

1906 births
1989 deaths
Musicians from Iași
Romanian Jews
Moldavian Jews
Romanian emigrants to the Soviet Union
Soviet Jews
20th-century classical composers
Jewish classical composers
Romanian musicologists
Romanian classical composers
Soviet classical composers
Soviet male classical composers
Pupils of Joseph Marx
Pupils of Anton Webern
20th-century musicologists
20th-century male musicians